Constant Dutilleux (5 October 1807, Douai - 21 October 1865, Paris) was a 19th-century French painter, illustrator and engraver. He was the great-grandfather of the composer Henri Dutilleux.

Dutilleux preferred  landscape paintings. He was mainly influenced by Eugène Delacroix and Jean-Baptiste-Camille Corot.

Works on public display 
In 2006, his works toured France as part of an exhibition on Constant Dutilleux,  and Eugène Delacroix.

 Hêtraie dans la forêt de Fontainebleau, Palais des Beaux-Arts de Lille 
 Le peintre Désiré Dubois peignant en plein air, (oil on canvas) Musée des beaux-arts d'Arras

Literature

External links

1807 births
1865 deaths
19th-century engravers
French engravers
19th-century French painters
French male painters
19th-century French male artists